Swiss Cup 2004–05 was the eightieth season of Switzerland's annual cup competition. It began on 17 September with the first games of Round 1 and ended on 16 May 2005 with the Final held at St. Jakob-Park, Basel. The winners earned a place in the second qualifying round of the UEFA Cup.

Round 1
Teams from Super League and Challenge League were seeded in this round. In a match, the home advantage was granted to the team from the lower league, if applicable.

|colspan="3" style="background-color:#99CCCC"|17 September 2004

|-
|colspan="3" style="background-color:#99CCCC"|18 September 2004

 

|-
|colspan="3" style="background-color:#99CCCC"|19 September 2004

|}

Round 2
Teams from Super League were seeded in this round and could not play against each other. In a match, the home advantage was granted to the team from the lower league, if applicable.

|colspan="3" style="background-color:#99CCCC"|22 October 2004

|-
|colspan="3" style="background-color:#99CCCC"|23 October 2004

|-
|colspan="3" style="background-color:#99CCCC"|24 October 2004

 

|}

Round 3
The ties were drawn, there was no seeding, everyone could meet everyone. The home advantage was granted to the team from the lower league, otherwise to the team that drawn first. 

|colspan="3" style="background-color:#99CCCC"|20 November 2004

|-
|colspan="3" style="background-color:#99CCCC"|21 November 2004

 

|}

Quarterfinals
The ties were drawn, there was no seeding, everyone could meet everyone. The home advantage was granted to the team that drawn first.

Semifinals
The ties were drawn, there was no seeding, everyone could meet everyone. The home advantage was granted to the team that drawn first.

Final
The game was played in the St. Jakob-Park Basel. The advantage of the home team was granted to the team that won semi-final number one.

External links
 Official site 

Swiss Cup seasons
Swiss Cup, 2004-05
Swiss Cup